Leanne Marie Chinery (born 24 November 1981) is a Canadian international lawn bowler.

Bowls career

Commonwealth Games
She was born in Chilliwack, British Columbia and represented Canada at the 2006 Commonwealth Games and the 2014 Commonwealth Games.

She was selected as part of the Canadian team for the 2018 Commonwealth Games on the Gold Coast in Queensland where she reached the semi finals of the fours with Joanna Cooper, Pricilla Westlake and Jackie Foster.

In 2022, she competed in the women's triples and the Women's fours at the 2022 Commonwealth Games.

Asia Pacific
Chinery won a triples bronze medal at the 2019 Asia Pacific Bowls Championships in the Gold Coast, Queensland.

World Championships
In 2020 she was selected for the 2020 World Outdoor Bowls Championship in Australia.

Personal life
Her partner is fellow bowls international Tony Grantham of New Zealand.

References

External links
 Leanne Chinery at Bowls Canada
 
 
 
 
 

1981 births
Living people
Canadian female bowls players
Commonwealth Games competitors for Canada
Bowls players at the 2006 Commonwealth Games
Bowls players at the 2014 Commonwealth Games
Bowls players at the 2018 Commonwealth Games
Bowls players at the 2022 Commonwealth Games
21st-century Canadian women